The 2009 Banka Koper Slovenia Open was a tennis tournament played on outdoor hard courts. It was the 5th edition of the Banka Koper Slovenia Open, and was part of the WTA International tournaments of the 2009 WTA Tour. It took place in Portorož, Slovenia, from July 20 through July 26, 2009.

WTA entrants

Seeds

Seedings are based on the rankings of July 13, 2009.

Other entrants
The following players received wildcards into the singles main draw

  Tadeja Majerič
  Nastja Kolar
  Petra Martić

The following players received entry from the qualifying draw:
  Anna Tatishvili
  Sesil Karatantcheva
  Vesna Manasieva
  Ksenia Pervak

Champions

Singles

 Dinara Safina def.  Sara Errani, 65–7, 6–1, 7–5
It was Safina's third title of the year and 12th of her career.

Doubles

 Julia Görges /  Vladimíra Uhlířová def.  Camille Pin /  Klára Zakopalová, 6–4, 6–2

External links
Official website

Banka Koper Slovenia Open
Banka Koper Slovenia Open
2009 in Slovenian tennis